Puneet Sharma is a Distinguished Technologist from the Hewlett Packard Laboratories, Palo Alto, CA where he heads the Networked Systems group. He started his research career as Research Scientist at HP Labs in September 1998.

Sharma was born in Delhi, India. He graduated with a B.Tech. in Computer Science and Engineering from the Indian Institute of Technology, Delhi in 1993. He earned his PhD in Computer Science from the University of Southern California. During his doctoral studies, he contributed to the standardisation of Protocol Independent Multicast.

His Ph.D. dissertation titled Scaling control traffic in network protocols hypothesises that unregulated growth of network control traffic such as routing, signalling and end-to-end protocol can jeopardise the primary function of the networks to carry data traffic. The dissertation presents designs for regulating network control traffic along three scaling dimensions: (1) frequency, (2) distribution scope, and (3) information aggregation. Several network protocols use the soft state paradigm for state management. These protocols use periodic refresh messages to keep the network state alive while adapting to changing network conditions. However, the scalability of protocols that use the soft-state approach is a concern. He co-invented the Scalable Timers approach for soft state protocols where timer values are adapted dynamically following the volume of control traffic and the available bandwidth on network link.

He was named Fellow of the Institute of Electrical and Electronics Engineers (IEEE) in 2014 for contributions to the design of scalable networking, software defined networks and energy efficiency in data centers. In 2011, Sharma was recognized as Distinguished Member of the Association for Computing Machinery (ACM) for contributions to computing research.

His work on Mobile Collaborative Communities has been featured in the New Scientist Magazine.

References

External links 

20th-century births
Living people
Indian computer scientists
Indian electrical engineers
Distinguished Members of the ACM
Fellow Members of the IEEE
IIT Delhi alumni
Hewlett-Packard people
21st-century American engineers
Year of birth missing (living people)
Place of birth missing (living people)
American electrical engineers